Clarence John Brown (January 15, 1895 – August 28, 1973) was a Vice Admiral in the United States Navy.

Biography
Brown was born January 15, 1895, in Plum City, Wisconsin. He would graduate from the University of Wisconsin-Madison and marry Augusta Duwe.

He died on August 28, 1973. He is buried with Augusta at Arlington National Cemetery.

Career
Brown was commissioned in the Medical Corps in 1917. His assignments included serving at Naval Base Guam. During World War II he would serve at Guantanamo Bay Naval Base, Naval Hospital Philadelphia, and with the United States Twelfth Fleet. Following the war he was named Deputy Chief of the Bureau of Medicine and Surgery.

Awards he received include the Navy Distinguished Service Medal and the Legion of Merit.

References

People from Pierce County, Wisconsin
Military personnel from Wisconsin
United States Navy vice admirals
Recipients of the Navy Distinguished Service Medal
Recipients of the Legion of Merit
United States Navy personnel of World War II
University of Wisconsin–Madison alumni
Burials at Arlington National Cemetery
1895 births
1973 deaths